Lun Bawang Football Club is a football club in Brunei, playing in the Brunei Super League. The club has its roots within the Lun Bawang community situated in northern Temburong District.

History
Lun Bawang FC was established in 2002 by members of the Lun Bawang Murut Brunei Association (PLBMB) and entered the Brunei football league system the following year, winning qualification to the 2003 B-League. Finishing ninth in the initial group stage, the Temburong natives find themselves in the newly established second tier of the competition the B-League Premier Two in 2005. They remained in the second level of the system until 2014, when they were champions of the 2014 Brunei Premier League and won promotion to the 2015 Brunei Super League. They avoided relegation that season via goal difference in expense of IKLS FC despite losing to them in their final match of the campaign.

After consecutive bottom-half finishes for three seasons, Lun Bawang FC pulled out of the league in 2020 and was replaced by Jerudong FC. A dormant period for the club followed, which ended when the club was invited to participate in the 2022 Brunei FA Cup. They have since re-entered the Brunei Super League starting from the 2023 edition.

Current squad

Honours
Brunei Premier League: 2014

References

Association football clubs established in 2002
Football clubs in Brunei